Riley Armstrong is a Contemporary Christian singer-songwriter from the hamlet of Dapp, Alberta, Canada.  His live performances have been described as innovative, engaging, funny and surprising.  Musically his work is eclectic, combining acoustic guitar and hip-hop rhythms, with layers of sound supported by sampling and programmed loops.  A few of his notable songs are "Sleep", ">" (Greater Than), "What I Found", and "The Only".

Musical career

Riley Armstrong moved to Vancouver at the age of 18 to pursue a career in music. He earned a degree in sound recording 
and soon became the sound engineer for the Christian rock band Hokus Pick. Armstrong was the engineer on the 1997 Hokus Pick album Snappy.  A year later he released his own independent effort Novel Reason under the pseudonym Plain Edson.

Riley persuaded the members of Hokus Pick to let him be their opening act, as well as being their sound engineer. While in Nashville on a Hokus Pick tour he befriended the members of the Christian rock band Audio Adrenaline.  Soon thereafter three members of Audio Adrenaline founded a new record company.  Riley was invited to be the first performer to release on their Flicker Records label.

He then moved from Vancouver to Nashville, where he spent the next five years. Riley Armstrong became the opening act for Audio Adrenaline. During this period he released a follow up album, Whatever the Weather.  Armstrong then asked to be released from Flicker Records and returned to Canada.  Marriage followed, with the couple settling in Calgary.  Riley and his wife Shannon have one son, Zeffren, who was born in 2005.  Also that year Riley released the album La Loop on the 7 Spin Music indie label.  His band members were Rick Enns on bass, Dan Kim on guitar and Jared Falk on drums.

During 2010 Riley Armstrong toured in the U.S. during which time he also opened for Starfield during their "The Saving One" tour.

Discography

Albums

 Novel Reason  (Independent, 1998) (as Plain Edson)
 Riley Armstrong (Flicker Records, 2000, reviews)
 Whatever the Weather (Flicker Records, 2002, reviews)
 La Loop (7 Spin Music, 2005, review)
 Alive and Acoustic (2007, live concert CD/DVD)
 Comedy Songs (2010, EP)

Songs on compilations
 Sea to Sea: For Endless Days, "Above Every Name" (CMC, 2006)
 GMA Canada presents 30th Anniversary Collection, "What I've Found" (CMC, 2008)

Video
 Not From These Here Parts (2003)

Awards and recognition
Shai Awards (formerly The Vibe Awards)
 2003 nominee, Male Vocalist of the Year
 2004 nominee, Male Vocalist of the Year

Collaborations and other credits
 engineer: Snappy by Hokus Pick (1997)
 background vocals: This Much I Understand by Carolyn Arends (1999)
 producer and engineer: The Late Show by Toby Penner (2003)

References

External links
 Official Riley Armstrong website
 Concert review, Spring 2009, York, Pa.. Retrieved 2011-02-12.
 Interview with Modern Disciple Magazine for Men (2004-02-21). Retrieved 2011-02-05.

Canadian singer-songwriters
Canadian performers of Christian music
Flicker Records artists
Living people
1976 births
21st-century Canadian male singers
Canadian male singer-songwriters